The Russia women's national under-20 basketball team is a national basketball team of Russia, administered by the Russian Basketball Federation. It represented the country in women's international under-20 basketball competitions.

After the 2022 Russian invasion of Ukraine, FIBA banned Russian teams and officials from participating in FIBA basketball competitions.

FIBA U20 Women's European Championship participations

FIBA Under-21 World Championship for Women participations

See also
Russia women's national basketball team
Russia women's national under-19 basketball team

References

External links
Archived records of Russia team participations

Basketball in Russia
Basketball
Women's national under-20 basketball teams